Chemical modification refers to a number of various processes involving the alteration of the chemical constitution or structure of molecules.

In chemistry
Chemical modification describes the conversion of macromolecules through a chemical reaction or series of reactions.

Chemically modified electrodes
Chemically modified electrodes are electrodes that have their surfaces chemically converted to change the electrode's properties, such as its physical, chemical, electrochemical, optical, electrical, and transport characteristics. These electrodes are used for advanced purposes in research and investigation.

In biochemistry
In biochemistry, chemical modification is the technique of anatomically reacting a protein or nucleic acid with a reagent or reagents. Obtaining laboratory information through chemical modification which can be utilized to:

 identify which parts of a molecule are exposed to a solvent.

 determine which residues are important for a particular phenotype, e.g., which residues are important for an enzymatic activity;
 introduce new groups into a macromolecule; and
 crosslink macromolecules intra- and intermolecularly.

Chemical modification of protein side chains
 Iodoacetamide
 Iodoacetic acid
 PEGylation
 BisSulfosuccinimidyl suberate
 1-Ethyl-3-(3-dimethylaminopropyl)carbodiimide
 N-Ethylmaleimide
 Methyl methanethiosulfonate 
 MTSL

References

Protein structure